Massive Change is an exhibition and book by designer Bruce Mau and the Institute without Boundaries, co-authored by Jennifer Leonard from her edited interviews.

Purpose
The exhibition, which was commissioned by the Vancouver Art Gallery and sponsored by Altria, looks at how design can be used as a methodology to address the problems inherent to our social, economic and political systems. The exhibit looks at the implementation of new ideas and technologies to address issues like environmental sustainability and poverty.

Installations
The exhibit was divided into eleven multimedia installations based on the following themes: urban, information, transportation, energy, images, markets, materials, manufacturing, military, health, wealth and politics. The displays included a genetically modified featherless chicken bred for tropical regions and a room made of garbage including discarded VHS tapes, computer keyboards, and dolls. The exhibit was on display at the Vancouver Art Gallery for three months from October 2, 2004 to January 3, 2005. From there, the exhibit went to the Art Gallery of Ontario in Toronto for three months from March 11 to May 29, 2005. The exhibit was on display at the Museum of Contemporary Art in Chicago from September 16, 2005 to December 31, 2006.

Other venues
The exhibition has also spawned a book co-authored by the curator Bruce Mau, with Jennifer Leonard, a weekly electronic newsletter, and a radio show on CIUT 89.5 at the University of Toronto, created and hosted by Jennifer Leonard.

References

External links
 Massive Change BMD's Massive Change Project. 
 Massive Change Weekly 
 Massive Change In Action The Massive Change educational project. 
 Review of Massive Change by Kathleen McLean  
 Review of Massive Change by Frog Style Biscuit
 Massive Change (2004) 
 Co-author Massive Change Jennifer Leonard's site
 Massive Change Radio Archive

Books about visual art